Several ships of the Chilean Navy have been named Almirante Latorre after Juan José Latorre:

 , a dreadnought battleship laid down in Britain in 1911, acquired still unfinished for the Royal Navy in 1914 and completed and put into service as HMS Canada, she was refitted and sold to Chile in 1920, commissioned into the Chilean Navy in 1921, decommissioned in 1958, and scrapped in 1959

Almirante Latorre, Chilean ship